USS Sterett (DDG-104) is a Flight IIA  guided missile destroyer of the United States Navy.

Etymology
USS Sterett is the fourth ship of the U.S. Navy to be named after Andrew Sterett, a U.S. naval officer who fought in the Quasi-War and the Barbary Wars.

History
The contract to build USS Sterett was awarded to Bath Iron Works Corporation in Bath, Maine on 13 September 2002. On 17 November 2005, her keel was laid down, and she was christened on 19 May 2007. The ship's sponsor was Michelle Sterett Bernson, a familial descendant of Andrew Sterett, who himself had no children.

The vessel's commissioning took place in Baltimore, Maryland, Andrew Sterett's birthplace, on 9 August 2008.  The ship's home port is Naval Base San Diego.

The ship was attacked without warning by Somali pirates using rocket-propelled grenades on 22 February 2011, during negotiations with the pirates for the release of four U.S. hostages, who were eventually killed.

The ship was under the control of Commander Carrier Strike Group 9.

In popular culture
USS Sterett served as one of the filming locations for the TNT's television series The Last Ship and its fictional setting, USS Nathan James (DDG-151).
USS Sterett served as the backdrop for a historic visit to Naval Base Point Loma by President Joe Biden in March 2023. The crew gave him a "line-the-rail" salute.

References

External links

 USS Sterett Association
 Official Ship's Site
 navsource.org: USS Sterett

Arleigh Burke-class destroyers
Ships built in Bath, Maine
2007 ships